Don't Wait Up may refer to:

 Don't Wait Up (TV series), a British sitcom that aired between 1983 and 1990
 Don't Wait Up (album), a 2014 album by American punk band Bane
 "Don't Wait Up" (song), a 2021 single by Colombian singer Shakira